Stéphane Cédric Bahoken (born 28 May 1992) is a professional footballer who plays as a striker for Süper Lig club Kasımpaşa. Born in France, he represents Cameroon at international level.

Club career

Nice
Born in Grasse, Bahoken began his professional career at OGC Nice, having spent seven years at the club's academy since the age of twelve. In the final game of the season, he made his debut, coming on as a substitute in the 79th minute for Julien Sablé, in a 2–1 loss against Valenciennes. Coincidentally, his debut was before his birthday. Having made five appearances in the 2011–12 season, he signed his first professional contract on a three-year deal.

In the 2012–13 season, Bahoken started to receive first-team appearances, mostly coming on as a substitute. His season, however, was mostly overshadowed because of his fractured fibula, which sustained in training and was out for several months. While playing for the reserves, he was suspended for three games after an incident off the pitch.

On the last day of the transfer window, Bahoken was linked with a loan move to Le Havre, but the move broke down soon after. Following the failed move, he scored the first two goals in a 2–0 win over Montpellier on 10 March 2013.

St Mirren (loan)
Bahoken joined Scottish Premiership side St Mirren on loan on 30 August 2013. He revealed he was recommended by former teammates and St Mirren himself, Esmaël Gonçalves. After playing four times for St Mirren, he returned to his parent club when the loan was cancelled on 31 December 2013. While at St Mirren, he was known to have a bad attitude, describing himself as "a spoilt kid".

Upon his return from loan, Bahoken was to be loaned back out to CA Bastia, but due to regulation restrictions imposed by the LFP it was confirmed he could not play for three clubs in one season. Following this decision, he returned to St Mirren to complete his season long loan. He said he rejoined St Mirren following talks with manager Claude Puel, as well as his family. Following his second spell, manager Danny Lennon urged fans to stand by him, due to Bahoken showing 'great desire' and a "positive attitude". After returning to the club, Bahoken failed to make another appearance before his unsuccessful loan spell ended.

Strasbourg
On 29 July 2014, Bahoken signed a two-year contract with Championnat National club RC Strasbourg Alsace. He made his league debut for the club on 8 August 2014, in a 3–1 victory over US Colomiers. Bahoken scored the winning goal in the Ligue 1 match vs Paris Saint-Germain on 2 December 2017.

Angers 
On 8 June 2018, Bahoken joined Angers SCO. He signed a contract with the club lasting until 2022.

Kasımpaşa
On 15 July 2022, Bahoken signed with Kasımpaşa in Turkey.

International career
Although born in France, Bahoken is eligible to play for Cameroon national team through his father. He was a youth international footballer for the France U20 side before switching allegiance to Cameroon.

Bahoken made his international debut for Cameroon in a 3–1 friendly win over Kuwait on 25 March 2018.

Personal life
Bahoken's father, Paul, played for the Cameroon national team at the 1982 FIFA World Cup as a forward. His mother, Pauline Medzina, is the younger sister of deceased actress Serange Mebina.

On 20 October 2020, Bahoken was handed a four-month suspended prison sentence with a fine of €2,000 for acts of domestic violence against his partner, as well as a three-month suspended sentence with a fine of €6,875 for a traffic violation.

Career statistics

Club

International

International goals
Scores and results list Cameroon's goal tally first.

Honours 
Cameroon

 Africa Cup of Nations bronze: 2021

References

External links
 
 
 

1992 births
Living people
People from Grasse
Association football forwards
Cameroonian footballers
Cameroon international footballers
French footballers
France youth international footballers
French sportspeople of Cameroonian descent
Citizens of Cameroon through descent
Ligue 1 players
Ligue 2 players
Championnat National players
Championnat National 2 players
Championnat National 3 players
Scottish Professional Football League players
Süper Lig players
OGC Nice players
St Mirren F.C. players
RC Strasbourg Alsace players
Angers SCO players
Kasımpaşa S.K. footballers
French expatriate footballers
Cameroonian expatriate footballers
Expatriate footballers in Scotland
French expatriate sportspeople in Scotland
Cameroonian expatriate sportspeople in Scotland
Expatriate footballers in Turkey
French expatriate sportspeople in Turkey
Cameroonian expatriate sportspeople in Turkey
2019 Africa Cup of Nations players
2021 Africa Cup of Nations players
Sportspeople from Alpes-Maritimes
Footballers from Provence-Alpes-Côte d'Azur